Clara Burnett (born August 28, 1941) is an American Democratic politician. She served as a member of the Mississippi House of Representatives from the 9th District from 2004 to 2015.

References

1941 births
Living people
People from Tunica, Mississippi
Women state legislators in Mississippi
Democratic Party members of the Mississippi House of Representatives
African-American women in politics
African-American state legislators in Mississippi
21st-century American women politicians
21st-century American politicians
21st-century African-American women
21st-century African-American politicians
20th-century African-American people
20th-century African-American women